The Other is a 1930 German drama film directed by Robert Wiene and starring Fritz Kortner, Käthe von Nagy and Heinrich George. It was based on the 1893 play Der Andere by Paul Lindau. It was shot at the Terra Studios in Berlin. A French-language version The Prosecutor Hallers was shot by Wiene immediately afterwards in the same Berlin studio, but with different actors.

Cast
 Fritz Kortner as Prosecutor Hallers
 Käthe von Nagy as Analie Frieben
 Heinrich George as Dickert
 Hermine Sterler as Hallers Schwester
 Ursula van Diemen as Marion
 Eduard von Winterstein as Dr. Koehler
 Oskar Sima as Gruenspecht
 Julius Falkenstein as Sekretaer Bremer
 Paul Bildt as Prof. Wertmann
 Otto Stoessel as Medizinalrat Rienhofer
 Emil Heyse as Polizeikommissar
 Hans Ahrens as Wachtmeister

See also
 The Other (1913)
 The Haller Case (1933), an Italian remake

References

Bibliography

External links

1930 films
1930 crime drama films
German crime drama films
German multilingual films
German films based on plays
1930s German-language films
German black-and-white films
Films of the Weimar Republic
Films directed by Robert Wiene
Films scored by Friedrich Hollaender
Remakes of German films
Sound film remakes of silent films
Terra Film films
1930 multilingual films
1930s German films
Films shot at Terra Studios